Sylvester James Jowett (27 January 1926 – 1986) was an English amateur footballer who played as a winger in the Football League for York City, and was on the books of Sheffield United without making a league appearance. He died in Salisbury, Wiltshire in 1986.

References

1926 births
1986 deaths
Association football forwards
English Football League players
English footballers
Sheffield United F.C. players
Footballers from Sheffield
York City F.C. players